Afrozomus machadoi is a species of arachnid belonging to the family Hubbardiidae in the order Schizomida, which are commonly known as short-tailed whip scorpions. It is the only identified species in the genus Afrozomus.

Distribution and habitat
The species can be found throughout Angola and the Democratic Republic of the Congo in Africa. They live in termite mounds, which likely provide Afrozomus machadoi with its food source.

References

External links 
 

Schizomida
Arthropods of Angola
Arthropods of the Democratic Republic of the Congo
Animals described in 1995